Dhamma Jagoda (28 January 1941 – 4 February 1988) was the first Head of the Drama Unit at the National Television channel Rupavahini Corporation in Sri Lanka. He was a pioneer theater and television play director and actor in Sri Lanka. He inaugurated the first theatre school (the Lionel Wendt Kala Kendra Ranga Shilpa Shalika) at Lionel Wendt Art Centre, Colombo 7,
in the 1970s and it was the foundation for many artists who have emerged in Sri Lanka in recent years. Dhamma Jagoda was educated at Mahinda College, Galle and Nalanda College, Colombo.

Directed Play
 1963 Vesmuhunu
 1970  'Kora Saha Andaya'(The Lame and the Blind) script Dharmasena Pathiraja Produced by Dhamma Jagoda
 1971 Malavun Nagiti
 Moscow GiniGani
 Sakala Jana
 Hotabariyudde
 Kuriru Ranga( Play of cruelty)
 Parasthawa and Porisadaya

Directed Television Play
 Palingu Menike
 Mihikathage Daruvo
 Dimuthu muthu

Performed Play
1963  Kuveni
 1968 E. M. Forster’s A Passage To India:
1976 Nattukkari
 Punchi Palingurena
 Maname
 Kelani Palama
 Muhudu Puttu
 Kontara

Performed Film
 Mahagedara as Premasiri 
 Madol Duwa as Balappu 
 Mummulawela
 Green Emerald

Awards
 1963 Best Actor- role of 'Kawlavsky'  for "Ves Muhunu"

References

External links

Dhamma Jagoda in Sinhala Cinema Database
www.gratiaen.com
Dhamma Jagoda remembered

1941 births
1988 deaths
Sri Lankan dramatists and playwrights
Sri Lankan male film actors
Sinhalese male actors
Alumni of Nalanda College, Colombo
Alumni of Mahinda College
20th-century dramatists and playwrights
20th-century Sri Lankan male actors